Michael Anthony Buttacavoli (born March 26, 1988) is an American professional golfer who currently plays on PGA Tour Latinoamérica, having previously played on the NGA Pro Golf Tour.

Amateur career
Prior to turning professional, Buttacavoli represented the Rice Owls at college and was their leading golfer during the 2009–10 season.

Professional career
Buttacavoli turned professional in 2010 and played on the NGA Pro Golf Tour in 2011 and 2012 seasons before gaining membership to PGA Tour Latinoamérica for the 2013 season.

In 2013, Buttacavoli managed two top-10 finishes on PGA Tour Latinoamérica, eventually finishing 30th in the Order of Merit and retaining his playing rights for the 2014 season.

In May 2014, Buttcavoli recorded his first professional win at the Dominican Republic Open after overcoming a six stroke deficit on the final seven holes and winning a three hole playoff.

Professional wins (4)

PGA Tour Latinoamérica wins (4)

*Note: The 2018 BMW Jamaica Classic was shortened to 54 holes due to weather.

References

External links

American male golfers
Rice Owls men's golfers
PGA Tour Latinoamérica golfers
Golfers from Florida
Sportspeople from Miami Beach, Florida
1988 births
Living people